The Challenge Project was an insurgency plan orchestrated by Directorate 14. Special Operations, a branch of Iraqi Intelligence Service. The Challenge Project was Saddam Hussein's pre-US invasion (see Iraq War) backup plan for establishing a long-term insurgency designed to inhibit the American occupation of Iraq. 

On the eve of the US-led invasion of Iraq, Directorate 14. Special Operations was instructed to establish a network of intelligence agents who specialized in guerrilla warfare. These agents were instructed to wait until the American military was fully entrenched in the occupation of Iraq before starting insurgent activities.

Sources
 Duelfer: Iraqi Intel Trained Iraqis, Other Arabs at Salman Pak, NYT
 New York Times article

Iraqi insurgency (2003–2011)